Brent Erickson is an American computer and video game developer.

Career
Erickson has been programming computer games since he was 12. At the age of 13 he produced/published a text-based adventure game called "Trek For Riches" for the TRS-80.  

In 1992, he founded Flashpoint Productions which was sold to Bethesda Softworks in 1995.

Erickson has been credited in over 50 software titles including such products as Martian Memorandum, Mean Streets, and the extremely popular golf simulation program, Links.

Personal life
He lived in Steilacoom as a child before his family moved to Salt Lake City.He attended the University of Utah for four years, but he never got his business degree because he was too busy actually working.

Credits

References

1966 births
American video game designers
American video game producers
American video game programmers
Bethesda Softworks employees
Living people
People from Montrose, Colorado
Video game writers